Juma Jabu (born 28 December 1988 in Dar-es-Salaam) is a Tanzanian footballer. He plays club football for Simba SC, and international football for the Tanzania national football team.

References

Tanzanian footballers
Tanzania international footballers
1988 births
Living people
Association football defenders
Tanzania A' international footballers
2009 African Nations Championship players